Konrad Enke (23 July 1934 – 13 November 2016) was a German swimmer who specialized in the 200 m breaststroke event. After winning five national titles in 1954–1955 and 1957–1959 he set a new European record at 2:38.4 in 1959. The next year he competed at the 1960 Summer Olympics, but failed to reach the final.

References

1934 births
2016 deaths
People from Pößneck
East German male breaststroke swimmers
German male breaststroke swimmers
Olympic swimmers of the United Team of Germany
Swimmers at the 1960 Summer Olympics
Sportspeople from Thuringia